Fugu Airport is an airport being constructed to serve Fugu County in northern Shaanxi Province, China. It is located near Sangyuanliang Village, Fugu Town.

The airport project was launched by the Fugu County government in 2009, and received approval from the State Council of China and the Central Military Commission on 23 January 2019. It will be the first county-level airport in Shaanxi.

It is projected to handle 450,000 passengers and 1,200 tons of cargo annually by 2025.

See also
List of airports in China
List of the busiest airports in China

References 

Airports in Shaanxi
Proposed airports in China
Yulin, Shaanxi